Matt Revolter is an American film producer and photographer who is best known for producing music videos, short films, and fine art.

Biography

Early life 
Revolter was born and raised in Santa Barbara, California. He started as a graffiti artist and graphic designer before receiving a formal education in media production. He began his professional career working as an illustrator creating original works for corporate advertising, fashion companies, and musicians. During this time he also ran a successful marketing firm in Los Angeles, and has had success working as a commercial artist and marketer.

His work often deals with such themes as identity, empathy, and death. When he was ten years old his neighbor was attacked and killed by a great white shark. Tragic life experiences have given him creative inspiration.

Revolter has an extensive collection of vintage cameras, and has a preference to acquire items that often have connections to famous filmmakers or movies.

Education 
Revolter graduated summa cum laude from Brooks Institute, where he received a Master of Fine Arts in Photography, Bachelor of Fine Arts in Film, and a Certificate in Cinematography.

Style
Revolter is known for creating empathetic and dark imagery set in high-concept settings. He claims to be "format agnostic" as he typically shoots with Red Digital Cinema Camera Company, Arri Alexa, Hasselblad, Phase One, Leica Camera, and Canon Inc. camera systems. He has incorporated principles derived from traditional cinema while shooting, which includes using film equipment and lighting techniques. Most of his scenes include real subjects in authentic locations, and he uses very little digital post-processing afterwards. Revolter's photographs are usually projected in large spaces, as opposed to being displayed in frames.

Career

Producer

In 2014 Revolter produced a winning short film titled The Way We Were, directed by Ayasylla Ghosn, for the Santa Barbara Film Festival's 10-10-10 Student Filmmaking Competition. He also produced Schoolboy Q's music video for "Hoover Street" that same year. In 2013 he produced the music video for Cali Swag District's "Shake Something".

Photographer
In 2015 Revolter installed a multimedia projection titled "Bodies on the Wall" on various buildings throughout California. The project was part of his graduating thesis and questioned how viewers analyzed, participated, and remembered their experiences regarding artwork in the digital age.

In 2014 Revolter's photography was installed on the Studio Wall at Brooks Institute. The images he displayed questioned the viewers' understanding of both the meaning, and the relationship between the photographs.

Firearm Manufacturer
In 2018 Revolter started manufacturing firearms under the name Revolt Arms in Santa Barbara, CA.

Filmography/exhibits
Notable work Revolter has produced include:

Short films

Music videos

Exhibitions

References

External links

Brooks Institute alumni
Living people
American film producers
Film producers from California
1984 births